Sohran-e Olya (also Romanized as Sohrān-e ‘Olyā; also known as Sohrūn-e Bālā (Persian: سهرون بالا) and Sohrān-e Bālā) is a village in Nakhlestan Rural District, in the Central District of Kahnuj County, Kerman Province, Iran. At the 2006 census, its population was 309, in 73 families.

References 

Populated places in Kahnuj County